Caruso, Zero for Conduct (Italian: Caruso, zero in condotta) is a 2001 Italian comedy film directed by Francesco Nuti.

Cast
Francesco Nuti as Lorenzo Caruso
Cecilia Dazzi as Olga
Giulia Serafini as Giulia
Lorenzo De Angelis as Diego
Carlo Monni as the farmer
Mario Patanè as the magistrate
Ramona Badescu as Trielina
Antonio Petrocelli as the school principal
Platinette as the nun

References

External links

2001 films
Films directed by Francesco Nuti
2000s Italian-language films
2001 comedy films
Italian comedy films
2000s Italian films